Liu Bin (born 2 May 1998) is a Chinese footballer who currently plays for Chengdu Rongcheng in the Chinese Super League.

Club career
Liu Bin signed with Serbian First League side FK Bežanija in July 2017. He joined Chinese Super League side Chongqing Dangdai Lifan on 2 January 2018. On 15 April 2018, he made his senior debut in a 3–3 home draw to Beijing Sinobo Guoan, coming on as a substitute for Liu Le in the 52nd minute. After two seasons with the club he would transfer to fellow top tier club Henan Jianye on 10 June 2020. He would not make any senior team appearances for Henan and on 11 April 2021 he would join second tier football club Chengdu Rongcheng. He would make his debut on 26 April 2021 in a league game against Jiangxi Beidamen, which ended in a 4-2 victory. At the end of the season he would establish himself as a regular within the team and aid them to promotion at the end of the 2021 league campaign.

Career statistics
.

References

External links
 

1998 births
Living people
Chinese footballers
Association football defenders
FK Bežanija players
Chongqing Liangjiang Athletic F.C. players
Chinese Super League players
Footballers from Shandong
Chinese expatriate footballers
Chinese expatriate sportspeople in Serbia
Expatriate footballers in Serbia